The Sigma SD10 is a digital single-lens reflex camera (DSLR)  manufactured by the Sigma Corporation of Japan.  It was announced on October 27, 2003, and is an evolution of the previous SD9 model, addressing many of the shortcomings of that camera.  The Sigma SD10 cameras are unique in the digital DSLR field in using full-color sensor technology, and in that they only produce raw format images that require post-processing on a computer.

Foveon X3 image sensor 

Like its predecessor, the SD10 uses a sensor with the unique Foveon X3 sensor technology. The 10.2-million-pixel raw file generated from this sensor is processed to produce a 3.4 megapixel size image file.  Although the image file is smaller than images from competing 10 megapixel cameras, it is made from the same number of measured data values because the Foveon sensor detects full-color data (three values) at each photosite; the actual resolution contained in its 3.4 MP images is about the same as a conventional Bayer/CFA sensor of 7–9 MP.  Sigma and Foveon count each red, green, and blue sensor as a pixel, and state the camera has 10.2 million pixels; similarly, companies selling Bayer sensor cameras also count each single-color sensor element as a pixel.

Raw output only 

Unlike other DSLR cameras marketed concurrently, the SD10 performs no in-camera processing to common image formats such as JPEG and TIFF.  Instead, it saves images in its own .X3F format, which retains all the information the camera captured.  Processing on a computer is required to use these files.  Sigma provides the Foveon-written SIGMA Photo Pro application for this purpose; in addition, Adobe Photoshop CS2 supports the format, as do several other image-processing applications.

Shooting modes 

The camera supports single-shot, continuous, 2 or 10 second self-timer, mirror lock-up, and auto exposure bracketing.

Exposure modes 

Four different exposure modes are supported: aperture priority (A), shutter speed priority (S), manual (M) and program automatic (P).

Lens availability 

The SD10 supports only Sigma SA mount lenses.  Only Sigma produces lenses to fit this mount, although their range is fairly broad.  Third-party converters exist for a number of other lens mounts, although no automatic features are supported. Many Canon EF mount-based lenses can be converted to Sigma AF mount retaining autofocus and camera controlled aperture setting, however optical stabilisation will not work.

Software

Sigma Photo Pro 

Postprocessing of raw X3F and JPEG of all digital SIGMA cameras

Version 6.x  is no-cost download for Windows 7+ and Mac OSX 10.7+  (6.3.x). Actual versions are 6.5.4 (Win 7+) and 6.5.5 (MacOSX 10.9+).

Pros and cons 

The SD10 is an unusual camera with both advantages and disadvantages compared to most other digital SLRs, and tends to polarise opinion.  It has a fiercely loyal base of support and some rather vocal detractors.  Commonly cited advantages and disadvantages of the camera include the following:

Pro 

 Excellent color in daylight and good light.
 Excellent detail, comparable to 6.5 MP Bayer-sensor DSLR cameras.
 Noise-free image of the at low ISO speeds
 Pixel sharpness achievable
 Moiré effects less visible when photographing high-detail patterns compared to Bayer senor based cameras; thus no need for sharpness-degrading antialiasing filters to reduce moiré effects
 High-quality PC software allows images to be tuned easily to the best quality
 Takes easily obtained AA or CR-V3 batteries instead of proprietary format
 Dust protector stops dust entering the mirror box while changing lenses
 Sports finder allows viewing area outside picture area, letting photographer see if a better composition could be made by zooming out
 Inexpensive when it can still be found
 Shooting-priority user interface means always ready to shoot
 Unique histogram feature shows distribution of RGB values in zoomed-in area of image
 Simple and intuitive menu system
 Mirror lock up on dial
 Removing the dust protector converts the SD10 into an infrared-sensitive camera

Con 

 Does not produce JPEG files in-camera
 Fewer photographs per image card because no JPEG mode available. Raw files are compressed to about 8 MB per image
 Slow to clear the shot buffer
 Originally expensive, listing at $1599 in U.S.
 Only takes Sigma lenses; no third party support except via adapters
 Poor low-light performance; high-ISO modes produce noisier images
 Image quality degrades in long exposures (over 4 seconds)
 No built-in flash
 Single autofocus sensor instead of three or more in competition

References

External links

 Official Sigma SD 10 Page
 Official Sigma SD10 Page (outdated)
 Official Sigma SD10 FAQ (outdated)
 Foveon.com, the maker of the X3 sensor used in the SD10
 DPReview.com Reviews the SD10
 SD10 user image galleries
 Sigma SLR Talk Forum on dpreview.com
 CNET Specs 
 SD10 Manual in PDF

SD10
Cameras introduced in 2003